Michael D. Ehlers is Chief Scientific Officer and a venture partner at life sciences venture capital firm Apple Tree Partners. He was formerly Executive Vice President for Research and Development at Biogen and before that was Chief Scientific Officer for Neuroscience at Pfizer. Prior to joining industry, Ehlers was the George Barth Geller Professor of Neurobiology and a Howard Hughes Medical Institute investigator at the Duke University Medical Center. His academic work was focused around neuronal organelles and the trafficking of neurotransmitter receptors.

He has a BS in chemistry from Caltech in 1991 and an MD and a PhD in neuroscience at Johns Hopkins School of Medicine with Richard L. Huganir. His work at Duke was centered around the trafficking of neurotransmitter receptors notably the AMPA receptor.

Ehler was born in Germany and raised in rural Nebraska. He plays French horn and piano. He first became interested in science as a child collecting insects and rocks. He was introduced to neurobiology when his girlfriend now wife suggested that math was involved with the field.

References

Living people
California Institute of Technology alumni
Johns Hopkins School of Medicine alumni
Duke University School of Medicine faculty
Year of birth missing (living people)
Pfizer people
Howard Hughes Medical Investigators
German neuroscientists